The Stafford Air & Space Museum is located in Weatherford, Oklahoma, United States. The museum, named for NASA astronaut and Weatherford native Thomas P. Stafford, became a Smithsonian Affiliate in June 2010. The museum features exhibits about aviation, space exploration, and rocketry, and a collection of over 20 historic aircraft.  Displays include Stafford's Apollo 10 spacesuit, the Gemini 6A spacecraft, artifacts from the Space Shuttle program, the Hubble Space Telescope, and the Mir Space Station, a Moon rock, a Titan II missile, and a Mark 6 re-entry vehicle.

The museum is located at the Thomas P. Stafford Airport.

Name

The museum is named for legendary astronaut and flight pioneer Lt. Gen. Thomas P. Stafford, a native of Weatherford and one of only 24 people to have traveled to the Moon. Graduating from the US Naval Academy, Stafford is a recipient of the Congressional Space Medal of Honor. A veteran of four space flights, he piloted Gemini 6A, and commanded Gemini 9A, the 1969 Moon orbiting mission Apollo 10, and the 1975 Apollo–Soyuz Test Project.

Exhibits
The center boasts one of the few actual Titan II launch vehicles on display. The huge rocket body crosses the back of a display gallery from one side of the building to the other.  Numerous items acquired from the Smithsonian and on display include: a Gemini flight suit, space food, survival items flown to the Moon on Apollo 11, and the actual flight pressure suit Stafford wore on Apollo 10, the first flight of the Apollo Lunar Module to the Moon.

The hatch through which U.S. astronauts and Russian cosmonauts docked and greeted each other in space during the 1975 Apollo–Soyuz mission is on display in the museum. Stafford is pictured reaching through the hatch shaking hands with a Russian cosmonaut Alexei Leonov. The actual uniforms that the two astronauts were wearing at the time are also on display.

Other exhibits include retired aircraft, such as a Russian MiG-21R and an F-16. Full-size replicas displayed include the Wright Flyer, Spirit of St. Louis, Apollo Command Module, and Gemini spacecraft. The museum also features the Rose & Tom Luczo Educational Center that features a flight simulation computer lab, kids library, and a  Talon A3 Motion-Based Flight Simulator that runs X-Plane 11 and Microsoft Flight Simulator X. Also on display is a TP-82 Cosmonaut survival pistol which was given to Stafford by Leonov.

As of March 5, 2018, the museum has acquired a Fairchild Republic A-10 Thunderbolt II, also known as the "Warthog." It is on display outside of the museum.  In July 2018, the Gemini 6A spacecraft was moved to the museum.

Early aviation 

 Wright Flyer (full scale, flyable replica)
 Blèriot XI (full scale replica)
 Curtiss Pusher (full scale, flyable replica)
 Sopwith Pup (full scale replica)
 Spirit of St. Louis (full scale replica)

Early rocketry 
 Goddard Rocket (full scale replica)
 V-2 Rocket Engine (actual artifact)
 Sputnik 1 (full scale replica)
 Explorer 1 (full scale replica)

Mercury, Gemini, and Apollo programs 
 Lunar Sample collected by Gene Cernan on Apollo 17 (actual artifact)
 Space Medal of Honor presented to Thomas P. Stafford in 1993 (actual artifact)
 1/72nd models of all of the man-rated rockets of the "Space Race"
 F-1 Rocket Engine (actual artifact)
 J-2 Rocket Engine (actual artifact)
 Mission Control Console from Johnson Space Center (actual used artifact)
 Gemini 6A spacecraft (actual artifact)
 Gen. Stafford's Gemini space suit (actual artifact)
 Gemini Spacecraft (full scale replica)
 Astronaut Maneuvering Unit Model
 Titan II Rocket (actual, flight-ready artifact)
 Apollo 10 Space Suit (actual flown artifact)
 Lunar Module Checklist (actual flown artifact)
 Apollo–Soyuz Docking Ring (actual artifact)
 1/2 Scale Lunar Module
 Apollo Command and Service Module (full scale replica)

Modern space and aviation 

 Mark 6 Nuclear Warhead (actual, but disarmed, artifact)
 1/15th scale Hubble Space Telescope
 Space Shuttle Main Engine (actual flown artifact)
 Shuttle Solid Rocket Booster Segment (actual flown artifact)
 Rocket "Crawler Shoe" (actual artifact)
 Bell X-1 (full scale replica)
 F-86 "Sabre" Fighter (actual artifact)
 MIG-21R "Fishbed" Fighter (actual artifact)
 T-38 "Talon" Trainer (actual artifact)
 T-33 Trainer (actual artifact)
 B-61 Thermonuclear Bomb (actual, but disarmed, artifact)
 F-16 "Fighting Falcon" (actual artifact)
 F-104 "Starfighter" (actual artifact)
 F-4 Phantom (actual artifact)
 A-10 Thunderbolt II "Warthog" (actual artifact)

References

External links 
 Museum website
  Stafford Air & Space Museum info, photos and videos on TravelOK.com Official travel and tourism website for the State of Oklahoma
 

Museums established in 1981
Aerospace museums in Oklahoma
Museums in Custer County, Oklahoma
1981 establishments in Oklahoma
Human spaceflight
Thomas P. Stafford